Zwang Peak is a mountain in the Diablo Range,  southwest of Avenal, and  about  from Interstate 5 in Kings County, California. The peak was named for cattle rancher Jake Zwang (1880–1968), who came to the area in 1906 to  start a cattle ranch southwest of Avenal. Garza Creek has its source near this peak.

References

Mountains of Kings County, California
Diablo Range
Mountains of Northern California